Pool C of the 2018 Fed Cup Asia/Oceania Zone Group II was one of four pools in the Asia/Oceania zone of the 2018 Fed Cup. Four teams competed in a round robin competition, with the top team and the bottom team proceeding to their respective sections of the play-offs the top team played for advancement to Group I.

Standings 

Standings are determined by: 1. number of wins; 2. number of matches; 3. in two-team ties, head-to-head records; 4. in three-team ties, (a) percentage of sets won (head-to-head records if two teams remain tied), then (b) percentage of games won (head-to-head records if two teams remain tied), then (c) Fed Cup rankings.

Round-robin

Malaysia vs. Oman

Pacific Oceania vs. Iran

Malaysia vs. Iran

Pacific Oceania vs. Oman

Malaysia vs. Pacific Oceania

Iran vs. Oman

References

External links 
 Fed Cup website

2018 Fed Cup Asia/Oceania Zone